Roy Heather (20 May 1935 – 3 September 2014) was an English television actor best remembered for playing cafe owner Sid in the sitcom Only Fools and Horses.

Heather was born in Stoke Poges, Buckinghamshire. After leaving school, he worked for an asbestos firm before National Service with the Royal Air Force. He then did several jobs, including working as a  Betterware household goods salesman, while continuing his interest in amateur acting. He was spotted by David Tudor, who gave him his first professional job in repertory theatre at the age of 44. While working for Tudor, he played many leading roles including Frank in Winter Journey and Reg in The Norman Conquests, and co-starred in the world premiere of Aurelia, with Ingrid Pitt. He debuted the role of Pistol in Peter Mottley's stage monologue, After Agincourt.

Heather appeared in various British television shows, usually in small roles, including Edge of Darkness, Poirot, The Legacy of Reginald Perrin, Birds of a Feather, Hi-De-Hi, Bottom, The Green Green Grass, The Bill and an episode of series 10 of BBC sitcom My Family. He appeared as a nameless old man in the Al Murray/Richard Herring programme Time Gentlemen Please. He also attended fan conventions for Only Fools and Horses.

Death
Heather died in Purbrook, Hampshire from undisclosed causes on 3 September 2014. He was 79 years old.

Filmography

Film

Television

References

External links
 

1935 births
2014 deaths
English male stage actors
English male television actors
People from South Bucks District
British male comedy actors